Arnold Rampersad (born 13 November 1941) is a biographer, literary critic, and academic, who was born in Trinidad and Tobago and moved to the US in 1965. The first volume (1986) of his Life of Langston Hughes was a finalist for the Pulitzer Prize and his Ralph Ellison: A Biography was a finalist for the 2007 National Book Award.

Rampersad is currently Professor of English and the Sara Hart Kimball Professor in the Humanities at Stanford University. He was Senior Associate Dean for the Humanities from January 2004 to August 2006.

Background and career
Born in Trinidad and Tobago, Rampersad moved to the US in 1965.

He graduated from Bowling Green State University with a bachelor's degree and master's degree in English (1967 and 1968). In 1973 he earned a Ph.D from Harvard University, his dissertation being subsequently published as the intellectual biography The Art and Imagination of W. E. B. Du Bois.

He was a member of the Stanford University English Department from 1974 to 1983, before accepting a position at Rutgers University. Since then he taught there and at Columbia and Princeton, before returning to Stanford in 1998. 

Rampersad's teaching covers such areas as 19th- and 20th-century American literature; the literature of the American South; American and African-American autobiography; race and American literature; and the Harlem Renaissance.

His published books include biographical works on W. E. B. Du Bois, Langston Hughes, Arthur Ashe, Jackie Robinson, Ralph Ellison, as well as edited volumes of writings by Richard Wright.

Honours
From 1991 to 1996, Rampersad held a MacArthur "Genius Grant" fellowship. He is an elected member of the American Academy of Arts and Sciences and of the American Philosophical Society. 

In 2007, his biography of Ralph Ellison (1914–1994), on which he had worked for eight years, was a nonfiction finalist for the National Book Award. 

In 2010, Rampersad was awarded the National Humanities Medal, and in 2012 was the recipient of the BIO Award from Biographers International Organization. Also in 2012, he won a Lifetime Achievement Prize from the Anisfield-Wolf Book Awards.

Personal life
Rampersad is the half-brother of Roger Toussaint, the president of Transport Workers Union Local 100.

Books
 The Art and Imagination of W. E. B. Du Bois (Harvard, 1976; reprint, with new introduction, Schocken, 1990)
 The Life of Langston Hughes (Oxford, 2 volumes, 1986, 1988)
 Days of Grace: A Memoir (Knopf, 1993), co-authored with Arthur Ashe
 Jackie Robinson: A Biography (Knopf, 1997)
 Ralph Ellison: A Biography (Knopf, 2007)

In addition, Rampersad has edited several volumes, including the following:
 Collected Poems of Langston Hughes, 
 The Library of America edition (2 vols) of works by Richard Wright, including revised individual editions of Native Son and Black Boy
 Slavery and the Literary Imagination (as co-author)
 Race and American Culture (co-editor with Shelley Fisher Fishkin) – in the book series published by Oxford University Press
 Poetry for Young People: Langston Hughes (co-editor with David Roessel) (Sterling Publishing Co., Inc., 2006)

References

External links
 Contacting Arnold Rampersad by email+

1941 births
American biographers
American people of Indian descent
American people of Trinidad and Tobago descent
Bowling Green State University alumni
Columbia University faculty
Harvard University alumni
Literary critics of English
Living people
MacArthur Fellows
Members of the American Philosophical Society
National Humanities Medal recipients
Princeton University faculty
Rutgers University faculty
Stanford University Department of English faculty